Princess Doae (died 1057) was a Goryeo Royal Princess as the only daughter of King Jeongjong and Queen Yongmok, also the niece of King Deokjong and maternal niece of his 4th wife. Since there are no detailed records left, so not much is known about her life.

References

Year of birth unknown
1057 deaths
Goryeo princesses
11th-century Korean women